William W. Kennison (1825–1893) was an officer in the United States Navy during the American Civil War.

Biography
Born in Massachusetts, Kennison was appointed Acting Master's Mate on 28 August 1861.
 in which Kennison was in charge of the forward  pivot gun. He was subsequently appointed commander of the schooner  in the North Atlantic Blockading Squadron in 1863, capturing the schooner Champion off the Piankatank River, Virginia, on 2 July, and a large yawl off Horn Harbor, Virginia, with cargo including salt, on 10 October. He later served aboard the steam gunboat , involved in operations off Charleston and Savannah in 1865. Following the war, he was honorably discharged on 4 May 1866, but was reappointed Acting Master on 20 August 1866. His final muster out date was 16 November 1868.

Namesake
The destroyer  (1918–1945) was named for him.

References
Notes

Bibliography
 
 

1825 births
1893 deaths
Union Navy officers
People of Massachusetts in the American Civil War